Prosoplus celebicus is a species of beetle in the family Cerambycidae. It was described by Stephan von Breuning in 1959. It is known from Sulawesi.

References

Prosoplus
Beetles described in 1959